Madame Louise (also titled "The Madame Gambles"), is a 1951 British comedy film directed by Maclean Rogers and produced by Ernest G. Roy and starring Richard Hearne, Petula Clark, Garry Marsh and Richard Gale. It is loosely based on the 1945 play Madame Louise by Vernon Sylvaine, which had featured Alfred Drayton and Robertson Hare, but was extensively reworked to suit the different stars of the film production.

Plot summary
In order to settle her debts, the owner of a dress shop transfers control to a bookmaker, Mr Trout. Trout is wanted by a gang of criminals and much mayhem follows, causing the usual stunts by Mr Pastry. He has patented a dress, modelled by the resourceful assistant Miss Penny (Petula Clark), which can be transformed from a day dress to an evening dress and other modes by the removal of the sleeves and part of the skirt. A good deal of slapstick is involved, with Hearne's acrobatic agility being much in evidence. All is well at the end of the film as the dress shop owner recovers her business (due to Mr Pastry's incompetence) and Pastry is rewarded by being made her business partner.

Cast

 Richard Hearne as Mr Pastry
 Petula Clark as Miss Penny
 Garry Marsh as Mr Trout
 Richard Gale as Lieutenant Edwards
 Doris Rogers as Mrs Trout
 Hilda Bayley as Madmoiselle
 Charles Farrell as Felling
 Robert Adair as Bookmaker	
 Anita Sharp-Bolster as Cafe Proprietress
 Vic Wise as Curly
 Harry Fowler as Trout's clerk
  John Powe as Dumbo
  Pauline Johnson as Pearl	
  Mavis Greenaway as Mannequin	
  Pat Raphael as Mannequin
  Doorn Van Steyne as Mannequin
 Mackenzie Ward as Business Man	
  Gerald Rex as Messenger

Critical reception
The Monthly Film Bulletin wrote: "This is not a particularly good comedy even of its type; it may amuse firm Mr. Pastry fans but Petula Clark is completely wasted in a coy love affair". Today's Cinema wrote: "The production word, if unpretentious, is competent; and the experienced hand of Maclean Rogers has kept the action moving fast and furiously. A pleasant little film successfully aimed at the vast market for unsophisticated British comedy...Richard Hearne virtually carries the whole film, which owes all its best moments to his unflagging agility."

References

External links

1951 films
1951 comedy films
British comedy films
Films directed by Maclean Rogers
Films set in England
Films shot at Nettlefold Studios
Films produced by Ernest G. Roy
British black-and-white films
1950s English-language films
1950s British films